Oos Raat Ke Baad is a 1969 thriller movie, directed and produced by YB Siraj under the banner Commercial Cine Corporation. The movie stars Sanjeev Kumar, Tanuja, Madan Puri, Sailesh Kumar, Aruna Irani, Shamminder and Kishore Bhatt. Other star casts include Tarun Bose, Bela Bose, Asit Sen, Pravin Paul Sunder, Amrita Patel, Dinesh Hingoo and Masterji. Story-screenplay-dialogue was written by Probodh Joshi. Mukesh, Asha Bhosle, Bula Gupta and Hemant Kumar rendered their voices. Title Song was by Anil Kumar and its lyrics by Gohar Kanpuri. Music of the film is given by Hemanta Mukherjee and lyrics by Gulzar.

Plot

Thakur Sunder Singh (Sanjeev Kumar) is the thakur, or lord, of a small estate. He lives in the estate's manor with his daughter Sharmila (Tanuja). His greedy brother Madan Singh (Madan Puri) also resides at the manor, and is constantly seeking money from Sunder Singh. In the past, Sunder Singh had an affair with a village girl, who gave birth to his illegitimate child. Sunder Singh refused to accept both of them as it would be against his family honor. His guilt over this situation causes him great anxiety, and he suffers from asthma and heart problems as a result.

Doctor Shyam attends the manor to treat Sunder Singh, and Sharmila falls in love with him. When her uncle Madan Singh sees Sharmila and Doctor Shyam flirting, he goes to Sunder Singh and informs him about his daughter's behavior. In a fit of rage, Sunder Singh quarrels with Sharmila and slaps her. She continues her secret relationship with the doctor behind her father's back. The stress causes Sunder Singh to have a heart attack. Sharmila decides to end her relationship with the doctor, wanting to prevent her father from suffering more pain.

Several days later, it is Sharmila’s birthday party. A number of guests are at the manor, including Doctor Shyam. A dancing girl (Aruna Irani) was also hired to performing mujra, a classical Kathak-style dance. The doctor goes to Sharmila's room to find her, and is spotted by Madan Singh. Madan Singh reports this to his brother Sunder Singh, who attacks the doctor in presence of the guests, telling him never return to the manor. Upset, Sharmila leaves her home the next morning to stay at a hostel.

Sunder Singh is extremely upset by the situation, and Madan Singh adds to his woes by marrying the mujra girl. Sunder Singh refuses to accept the mujra dancer as his sister-in-law and has another heart attack. Doctor Shyam is called, and he suggests that Sunder Singh forgive Sharmila in order to ease some of his tension. However, Sunder Singh believes that Doctor Shyam is scheming to get close to Sharmila again. Based on this, Madan Singh convinces his elder brother that Doctor Shyam is not trustworthy and that he should be replaced by another doctor. Madan Singh brings in Doctor Lakhan and Nurse Veera (Bela Bose) to attend him.

One night, Madan Singh asks Sunder Singh to sign a new will, with terms more favorable to Madan Singh. Shortly after, Sunder Singh has another heart attack. With the help of his accomplices, Doctor Lakhan and Nurse Veera, Madan Singh prevents Sunder Singh from taking any medicine, leading to Sunder Singh's death. Madan Singh then calls Doctor Shyam to the manor, telling him that Sunder Singh's condition is very serious. He accuses Doctor Shyam of murdering Sunder Singh and summons the police. Doctor Shyam manages to evade arrest.

Madan Singh has Sunder Singh cremated, and sends a telegram to Sharmila to inform her of her father’s death. When she returns, she finds that the manor is haunted by her father’s ghost and informs her uncle, who has her declared insane. One of the manor's old servants gets suspicious and informs the police department. Officers there ensure him that the truth will be discovered.

In the meantime, Sharmila has resumed her meetings with Doctor Shyam, although she refuses to marry him out of respect to her deceased father, who never gave his permission. She continues to have sightings of Sunder Singh's spirit in the manor. Some days later, Madan Singh finally sees the ghost of Sunder Singh. Fearful, he insists Sharmila and all others leave the manor. When Sharmila refuses to leave, Madan Singh shoots the spirit with a gun, revealing it to be a living person. The "ghost" tries to escape but is quickly caught.

The "ghost" reveals himself to be the illegitimate child of Sunder Singh. He had initially come to the manor to take revenge upon Sunder Singh for abandoning him. Instead, he witnessed Madan Singh preventing Sunder Singh from taking his heart medicine, leading to Sunder Singh's death. Madan Singh caught the illegitimate son watching the murder and threatened him, saying he would have the son's mother killed if he didn't pretend to be Sunder Singh's ghost and frighten Sharmila to death. Prompted by his mother, he instead chooses to save his half-sister.

The plot revealed, Madan Singh is arrested. The police discover that "Doctor" Lakhan was a criminal impersonating a doctor and "Nurse" Veera was a cabaret dancer.

Hindi-language thriller films
1960s thriller films
1960s Hindi-language films
1969 films
Indian thriller films